Aphanophleps is a genus of moths in the family Geometridae.

There are four species in the genus Aphanophleps:
 Aphanophleps adaucta
 Aphanophleps rubricolor
 Aphanophleps vinosaria
 Aphanophleps vulpina

References

Sterrhinae
Geometridae genera